Filatima asiatica is a moth of the family Gelechiidae. It is found in New Guinea, where it has been recorded from the Prince Alexander Mountains.

References

Moths described in 1961
Filatima